Hank Mobley is an album by jazz tenor saxophonist Hank Mobley released on the Blue Note label in 1957 as BLP 1568. It was recorded on June 23, 1957 and features Mobley, trumpeter Bill Hardman, alto saxophonist Curtis Porter, pianist Sonny Clark, bassist Paul Chambers, and drummer Art Taylor.

Reception
The Allmusic review awarded the album 3 stars.

Track listing 
 "Mighty Moe and Joe" (Porter) - 6:53
 "Falling in Love with Love" (Hart, Rodgers) -	5:26
 "Bags' Groove" (Jackson) - 5:53
 "Double Exposure" (Mobley) - 8:04
 "News" (Porter) - 8:12

Personnel 
 Hank Mobley - tenor saxophone
 Bill Hardman - trumpet
 Curtis Porter - alto saxophone, tenor saxophone
 Sonny Clark - piano
 Paul Chambers - bass
 Art Taylor - drums

Collector Status 
Mobley 1568 is considered to be one of the most difficult to find and collectable albums in its original pressing form in the Blue Note discography. It was not reissued in the typical fashion by United Artists in 1971, and sold poorly in its initial pressing. Collectors quality copies of the first pressing regularly command well over $3,000.

References 

1958 albums
Albums produced by Alfred Lion
Albums recorded at Van Gelder Studio
Blue Note Records albums
Hank Mobley albums
Hard bop albums